John Herby Himes   (September 22, 1878 – December 16, 1949) was a Major League Baseball outfielder who played for the St. Louis Cardinals in 1905 and 1906.

External links

1878 births
1949 deaths
St. Louis Cardinals players
Major League Baseball outfielders
Baseball players from Ohio
Cedar Rapids Rabbits players
Indianapolis Indians players
Rock Island Islanders players
Johnstown Johnnies players
Scranton Miners players
Altoona Rams players
People from Bryan, Ohio